Sebastiania riparia is a species of flowering plant in the family Euphorbiaceae. It was described in 1821. It is native to Espírito Santo, Brazil.

References

Plants described in 1821
Flora of Brazil
riparia